Reynaldo Silvio Aimonetti (born 5 February 1943) is an Argentine former footballer. He played as a midfielder or forward during his 4-year career, during which he played for the Argentina national football team and Primera División club Boca Juniors.

References

1943 births
Living people
Association football forwards
Argentine footballers
Boca Juniors footballers
Pan American Games medalists in football
Pan American Games silver medalists for Argentina
Footballers at the 1963 Pan American Games
Medalists at the 1963 Pan American Games